Monument of Sokołowo - a monument commemorating the victims of the Battle of Sokołowo on May 2, 1848 during the Greater Poland Uprising. In the battle the forces of the Prussian led by Gen. A. Hirschfeld were against the Polish insurgents who were helped by local peasants and their leader was Ludwik Mierosławski. The victorious battle more than 300 insurgents were killed. This event also marks the Song of 1848. The monument was built according to Cyprian Norwid's idea.

Location 
Monument stays in Sokołowo village near trunk road 15 in Września's district, province wielkopolska.

History of the monument 
The monument was built in autumn in 1848. The dedication ceremony was held on November 23, 1848. In 1926, thanks to Count Mycielski the property was with stylized battle scythes. During the German occupation, the statue was destroyed by the Nazis. After the Second World War in 1945, the monument was reconstructed, and in 1961 the monument was placed on an eight-meter mound. In 1998 the monument was renovated and was celebrated the 150th anniversary of the Spring of Nations.

Gallery 

Monuments and memorials in Poland
Gmina Września